Hopmare is a village in Kwoor, Tambrauw Regency of Southwest Papua, Indonesia.

Demography

Population
As of the 2020 census, the population of Hopmare was 260.

References

Populated places in Southwest Papua
Populated places in Tambrauw
Southwest Papua